Levi Martin Nyagura is a Zimbabwean academic. He was appointed Vice Chancellor of the University of Zimbabwe in January 2003 and was subsequently reappointed for a second, third and a fourth term, the latter of which ended in mid 2018.

Education and career 

Levi Nyagura holds a PhD in Mathematics from Southern Illinois University, USA. He has a background as a Mathematics lecturer; he graduated with a Bachelor of Science Special Honours in Mathematics from the University of Rhodesia, then graduated with a BSc degree in Mathematics and Physics from University of London, United Kingdom.  He went on to complete a Graduate Certificate of Education at the University of Zimbabwe and later an MSc degree in Mathematics with the University of South Africa before doing his PhD in the United States.

Awards 

Nyagura was awarded The Zimbabwe Institute of Management Public Services Manager of the Year (2005), The Zimbabwe Institute of Management Harare Regional Public Services Manager of the Year (2012) and The Zimbabwe Institute of Management Public Services Manager of the Year (2012)

Controversies 
Nyagura controversially awarded a PhD degree to Grace Mugabe in 2014.

In 2015 Nyagura controversially fired a senior university staffer Senior Assistant Registrar Ngaatendwe Takawira for allegedly procuring a small cap for Robert Mugabe that failed to fit during a graduation ceremony he officiated as Chancellor of the University of Zimbabwe in October 2015, a decision later reversed by a Zimbabwean court.

Nyagura has been widely criticized for presiding over the University of Zimbabwe's demise, characterized by a failure to retain staff because of poor remuneration, politicization of the institution, purges of independent minded academics, and purges of senior academics who protested Nyagura's leadership style. He reportedly boasts of his penchant for firing staff and not renewing contracts.

Publications 
Nyagura has published mainly on teacher  and student performance in Zimbabwe's schools, as well as overall school performance.

References

Heads of universities and colleges in Zimbabwe
Living people
University of Zimbabwe alumni
Academic staff of the University of Zimbabwe
Alumni of University of London Worldwide
Alumni of the University of London
Southern Illinois University alumni
Year of birth missing (living people)